Mitch Traphagen (born November 22, 1962) is an American journalist and the producer of a video documentary.  He has written for the Observer News Publications in Tampa, Florida, since 2001.  He is known for narrative writing style and for personal profiles of both well known and little known but noteworthy individuals.  He is currently the publisher and editor of The East Iowa Herald based in Victor, Iowa.

Biography

Traphagen was born in Walla Walla, Washington, to Bruce Lee and Esther Traphagen.  He spent his formative years in the small midwestern town of Worthington, Minnesota.  In 1988 he earned a bachelor of science degree in business from the University of Northern Colorado in Greeley and subsequently developed analytical computer models for Target Stores in Minneapolis, Minnesota.  He married Michelle Majestic of Bloomington, Minnesota in 1997.

In 1999, he spent six months cruising the Bahamas and Caribbean aboard a small sailboat along with his wife, Michelle, and became a Commodore in the Seven Seas Cruising Association.  Upon returning to the United States, he began working as a freelance photojournalist for a community newspaper in the Tampa Bay area.  Within his first month in this career, he covered President George W. Bush in Sarasota, Florida, on September 11, 2001.  In 2005, he produced a documentary video on traveling aboard small boats.  He was the among the first to report on a powerful earthquake centered in the Gulf of Mexico and felt throughout the Southeastern United States in September, 2006.  His narrative travel stories and profiles are referenced on numerous personal business and government Websites.

External links
 Official Site
 Mitch Traphagen on IMDB
 The Observer News
 The East Iowa Herald
 Society of Professional Journalists

1962 births
American male journalists
Living people
People from Walla Walla, Washington
20th-century American journalists
People from Worthington, Minnesota